Just a Poke is the first album by the band Sweet Smoke, released in 1970, engineered by Conny Plank.
The song "Baby Night" displays the band's progressive jazz fusion style at the time.  The song can be divided into three main sections, the highlights being the instrumental sections.

Track listing

Side one
"Baby Night" - 16:24
''including ″In The World Of Glass Teardrops″ (A.Guillery), ″The Soft Parade″ (Jim Morrison)

Side two
"Silly Sally" – 16:22

Personnel
 Michael Paris – tenor sax, vocals, alto recorder, percussion
 Marvin Kaminowitz – lead guitar, vocals
 Steve Rosenstein – rhythm guitar, vocals
 Andrew Dershin – bass
 Jay Dorfman – drums, percussion

Production
 Engineer – Conrad Plank, Klaus Löhmer  
 Photography (Linerphoto) - Joachim Hassenburs

References

External links
Reviews at www.progarchives.com

Sweet Smoke albums
1970 debut albums
EMI Columbia Records albums